Finnish may refer to:
 Something or someone from, or related to Finland
 Culture of Finland
 Finnish people or Finns, the primary ethnic group in Finland
 Finnish language, the national language of the Finnish people
 Finnish cuisine

See also
 Finish (disambiguation)
 Finland (disambiguation)
 Suomi (disambiguation)

Language and nationality disambiguation pages